The Electoral district of Doncaster was a metropolitan electorate of the Victorian Legislative Assembly, 
located approximately 13 kilometres north-east of Melbourne. It was part of the Upper House Eastern Metropolitan Region and sat entirely within the City of Manningham. It was abolished and divided between the Electoral district of Bulleen and the Electoral district of Warrandyte The seat was abolished due to new boundary changes in preparation for the 2014 election.

Profile
Doncaster covered 25 square kilometres and comprised the majority of the suburbs of Doncaster, Doncaster East and Donvale, excluding portions of the northern parts of these suburbs, which all lie within the City of Manningham in Melbourne's eastern suburbs. A residential suburban electorate, Doncaster was a moderately hilly area north of the Koonung Creek and west of the Mullum Mullum Creek. Its urban features included predominantly low-density suburban dwellings, gardens and reserves, shopping centres and an abundance of sports amenities.

History
Prior to 1976, the area of Doncaster/Templestowe was included in the seats of South Bourke, Evelyn, Mernda and Box Hill. In 1976, rapidly increasing population led to the split-up of the seat of Box Hill into Doncaster and Box Hill.

Members for Doncaster

Election results

External links
Doncaster district - Victorian Electoral Commission

References

1976 establishments in Australia
2014 disestablishments in Australia
Former electoral districts of Victoria (Australia)